The 2006–07 season was Villarreal Club de Fútbol's 84th season in existence and the club's 7th consecutive season in the top flight of Spanish football. In addition to the domestic league, Villarreal participated in this season's editions of the Copa del Rey and the UEFA Intertoto Cup. The season covered the period from 1 July 2006 to 30 June 2007.

Players

First-team squad

Competitions

Overall record

La Liga

League table

Results summary

Results by round

Matches

Copa del Rey

Round of 32

Round of 16

UEFA Intertoto Cup

Third round

References

Villarreal CF seasons
Villarreal